The 1934 Saint Mary's Gaels football team was an American football team that represented Saint Mary's College of California during the 1934 college football season.  In their 14th season under head coach Slip Madigan, the Gaels compiled a 7–2 record and outscored their opponents by a combined total of 125 to 40.  The Gaels' victories included a 7–0 besting of California, a 14-9 victory over Fordham, a 9-6 victory over Washington State, and a 13-7 victory over Oregon. The lone setbacks were losses to Nevada (7-9) and UCLA (0-6).

Two Gaels received honors on the 1934 All-Pacific Coast football team: end Ed Erdelatz (AP-2, UP-2); and tackle John Yezerski (UP-2).

Schedule

References

Saint Mary's
Saint Mary's Gaels football seasons
Saint Mary's Gaels football